Frederic Moore (23 August 1851 – 2 May 1926) was a British sport shooter. Competing for Great Britain, he won a gold medal in team trap shooting at the 1908 Summer Olympics in London.

References

External links
 

1851 births
1926 deaths
British male sport shooters
Olympic shooters of Great Britain
Olympic gold medallists for Great Britain
Shooters at the 1908 Summer Olympics
Medalists at the 1908 Summer Olympics
Place of birth missing
Olympic medalists in shooting